Mission Possible is a community economic development agency operating in Vancouver Downtown Eastside district, founded in 1992. Mission Possible supports individuals who are challenged with poverty to navigate their journey to a sustainable livelihood. This is done through employment training and individual coaching in the Employment Readiness Program, and by offering transitional work opportunities in social enterprises. 

Mission Possible runs two social enterprises, MP Maintenance and MP Neighbors, offering empowerment through opportunity. Mission Possible provides the training, support, and work experience to help people create a sustainable livelihood that benefits participants and the community.

Services and Social Enterprises 

Mission Possible is organized into these departments:

 Employment Readiness Program (ERP) - Supports individuals experiencing barriers to employment. Offers skills training, work experience, and employment support, such as creating a resume and gaining references. The ERP functions as a stepping stone transitioning into a more permanent employment opportunity.
 MP Maintenance - Provides training and direct short-term employment in property maintenance tasks such as window washing, graffiti removal, painting, and general grounds clean-up. It is a full service exterior property cleaning company that provides high calibre services while employing individuals with barriers to employment.
 MP Neighbors - a community-based solution to community safety and security. Crews complete regular neighborhood routes in the Downtown Eastside, providing outreach and referral services to people on the streets, checking in with businesses, and building connections between these diverse groups. Additionally, the Neighbors program does needle pick-up, a service that impacts Vancouver by keeping it cleaner and safer.
Recycling Pick-Up - Works together with a local recycling company to perform home and office materials recycling pick-up.
 Power Breakfast & Coffee House - offers a weekend meal service for Downtown Eastside community members who wish to build connection to Mission Possible without yet joining the Employment Readiness Program.

References

External links
 A CNN interview with Executive Director Brian Postlewaite explaining Mission Possible's philosophy and purpose.
 Mission Possible is supported by local business.
 University of British Columbia.
 Trinity Western University Magazine.
 The Province Newspaper.

Organizations based in Vancouver